Marvin Willis "Will" Claxton III (born September 14, 1981) is an American professional golfer.

Claxton was born and raised in Swainsboro, Georgia, where he helped the Swainsboro High School golf team win four consecutive regional championships during his time there. In his senior year of high school, he was named to the 1999 Polo Golf Junior All-America team. He went on to attend Auburn University and was a member of the Tigers' 2002 SEC Championship team. During his freshman year, he finished 4th in the SEC Tournament, and 3rd in 2003.  Academically, he majored in Economics and graduated in 2005.

Claxton turned professional in 2005. He joined the Hooters Tour in 2005, and was a member until 2008.  He was a member of the eGolf Professional Tour in 2009.  He was a member of the Nationwide Tour from 2010 to 2011. In 2011, Claxton earned an invitation to the 2011 Transitions Championship, his first career PGA Tour start, where he made the cut and finished T-67 for the event.

In 2011, in his second attempt to earn a PGA Tour card through the Qualifying School, Claxton was in first place after the first four rounds of competition.  He remained in the top-25 at the end of the week to earn his first PGA Tour card.

In 2012, his first year on the PGA Tour, Claxton played in 28 tour events, making the cut in 21, and had two top-10 finishes. He advanced to the FedEx Cup playoffs but missed the cut at The Barclays and failed to advance to the Deutsche Bank Championship. With a finish of 120 on the final 2012 PGA Tour money list, Claxton claimed a tour card for 2013.

In 2013, he made only 9 cuts in 24 events. He played in the Web.com Tour Finals and finished 22nd to retain his PGA Tour card for 2014.

In 2013–14, he only played 8 events, making 4 cuts, until he had to retire for the season due to surgery with his last event being the 2014 AT&T Pebble Beach National Pro-Am He has a twelve-event medical extension available upon his return. He returned in June 2018 at the FedEx St. Jude Classic.

His highest finish to date is a T-5 at the 2012 True South Classic.

Claxton currently resides in Auburn, Alabama.

PGA Tour career summary

* As of the 2016–17 season.

See also
2011 PGA Tour Qualifying School graduates
2013 Web.com Tour Finals graduates

References

External links

American male golfers
Auburn Tigers men's golfers
PGA Tour golfers
Korn Ferry Tour graduates
Golfers from Georgia (U.S. state)
Golfers from Alabama
People from Swainsboro, Georgia
Sportspeople from Auburn, Alabama
1981 births
Living people